Borsonia is a genus of sea snails, marine gastropod mollusks in the family Borsoniidae.

Description
The fusiform shell has medium to small size. It has an elevated spire and a well-marked siphonal canal. The whorls of the spire are usually angulated near the middle. On this angle they show elongated nodes or axial ribs. These nodes disappear almost completely at the last section of the body whorl. The sutures are distinct. The aperture is elongate and is about half as long as the shell. The simple outer lip curves back near the top and forms a deep notch.  The columella is nearly straight and has none, one or two strong plications on the upper half. The anal sinus of the outer lip is not deep  The sinus area between and the strong sutural cord are well excavated. There is an opening in the infrasutural depression of the body whorl.

Distribution
At considerable depths in the subtropical and temperate waters of the Pacific Ocean and the Atlantic Ocean; in shallower boreal waters.

Species
Species within the genus Borsonia include:
 Borsonia armata Boettger, 1895
 Borsonia brasiliana Tippett, 1983
 Borsonia ceroplasta (Watson, 1881)
 † Borsonia cliffdenensis H. Finlay, 1930
 † Borsonia crassiaxialis Maxwell, 1992
 Borsonia epigona Martens, 1901
 Borsonia hirondelleae (Dautzenberg, 1891)
 Borsonia jaffa Cotton, 1947
 Borsonia jaya Sysoev, 1997
 † Borsonia meridionalis Lozouet, 2017 
 † Borsonia mitromorphoides Suter, 1917
 Borsonia ochracea Thiele, 1925
 † Borsonia prima Bellardi, 1839 
 † Borsonia pulchra Peyrot, 1931
 Borsonia saccoi Dall, 1908
 Borsonia silicea (Watson, 1881)
 Borsonia smithi Schepman, 1913
 Borsonia symbiophora Sysoev, 1996
 Borsonia symbiotes (Wood-Mason & Alcock, 1891) 
 Borsonia syngenes (Watson, 1881)
 Borsonia timorensis (Schepman, 1913)
 † Borsonia zelandica (P. Marshall, 1919) 
Species brought into synonymy
 Borsonia agassizii Dall, 1908 : synonym of Borsonella agassizii (Dall, 1908)
 Borsonia bifasciata Pease, 1860 : synonym of Kermia bifasciata (Pease, 1860)
 † Borsonia brachyspira Suter, 1917: synonym of † Mitromorpha brachyspira (Suter, 1917) 
 Borsonia coronadoi Dall, 1908: synonym of Borsonella coronadoi (Dall, 1908)
 Borsonia crassicostata Pease, 1860: synonym of Lienardia crassicostata (Pease, 1860)
 Borsonia diegensis Dall, 1908 : synonym of Borsonella diegensis (Dall, 1908)
 † Borsonia inculta Moody, 1916: synonym of Pseudotaranis strongi (Arnold, 1903) 
 Borsonia lutea Pease, 1860: synonym of Kermia lutea (Pease, 1860)
 Borsonia nebulosa Pease, 1860  synonym of Pseudodaphnella nebulosa (Pease, 1860)
 Borsonia rouaultii Dall, 1889: synonym of Cordieria rouaultii (Dall, 1889)

References

 Gofas, S.; Le Renard, J.; Bouchet, P. (2001). Mollusca, in: Costello, M.J. et al. (Ed.) (2001). European register of marine species: a check-list of the marine species in Europe and a bibliography of guides to their identification. Collection Patrimoines Naturels, 50: pp. 180–213
 Lozouet (P.), 2017 Les Conoidea de l’Oligocène supérieur (Chattien) du bassin de l’Adour (Sud-Ouest de la France). Cossmanniana, t. 19, p. 1-179

External links
  Bouchet P., Kantor Yu.I., Sysoev A. & Puillandre N. (2011) A new operational classification of the Conoidea. Journal of Molluscan Studies 77: 273-308.

 
Borsoniidae
Gastropod genera